Raymond Howard (born March 13, 1935) is an American politician who served in the Missouri Senate and the Missouri House of Representatives. He was previously elected to the Missouri House of Representatives in 1964, serving until 1968.  Howard served in the U.S. Army as a paratrooper in the 82nd Airborne, reaching the rank of lieutenant.

In 1968, Howard defeated Michael Kinney, the longest-serving elected official in Missouri, if not the United States. In 1976, Howard was defeated for re-election by J. B. Banks by 417 votes.

In 2014, he was inducted into the National Bar Association Hall of Fame.

References

1935 births
Living people
Politicians from St. Louis
University of Wisconsin–Madison alumni
Saint Louis University School of Law alumni
Missouri lawyers
Democratic Party members of the Missouri House of Representatives
Democratic Party Missouri state senators
United States Army soldiers